Ralf Parve (until 1978 Ralf Perman; 25 June 1919 Rakvere – 29 April 2011 Tallinn) was an Estonian writer. He was used several pseudonyms: Nähvits, Mart Raju, Rahula Pärn; SMERSh and KGB agent name Peiker.

In 1940s he was an editor for youth journal Pioneer. During World War II, he was mobilized into Red Army. From 1951 he was a professional author.

From 1947 to 1989 he was a member of CPSU. From 1945 he was a member of Estonian Writers' Union.

His spouse was the writer Lilli Promet.

He died in Tallinn and he is buried in Metsakalmistu Cemetery.

Selected works
 1958: poetry collection "Avatud värav" ('The Open Gate')
 1964: poetry collection "Lüüriline stenogramm" ('Lyrical Shorthand')
 1969: selection "Tuulenooled" ('Wind-arrows')

References

1919 births
2011 deaths
Estonian male poets
Estonian dramatists and playwrights
20th-century Estonian writers
21st-century Estonian writers
People from Rakvere
Soviet military personnel of World War II
Soviet writers
Soviet poets